Kalyan Malik is an Indian music director and playback singer in Telugu cinema. Since achieving recognition through Chandra Sekhar Yeleti's film Aithe (2003), Malik has provided musical scores for many other films. His most recent works are composing for Oohalu Gusagusalade (2014) and as sound supervisor for Baahubali: The Beginning. He is known by various other names  Kalyan Koduri, Koduri Kalyan.

Early life 
Kalyani Malik was born as "Koduri Kalyani". He born and brought up in Kovvur, to Siva Shakthi Datta and Bhanumathi. He is the brother of music composer M. M. Keeravani and cousin to director S. S. Rajamouli, S. S. Kanchi and M. M. Srilekha. Kalyan has always been close to music and cinema. At a very young age, his inclination to music made him start assisting his brother M. M. Keeravani. His uncle V. Vijayendra Prasad is a popular script writer in the Indian film industry.

Name 
His birth name was Kalyani. He suffixed Malik to his name, as he is a devotee of Lord Mallikarjuna of Srisailam, and uses the screen name "Kalyani Malik". He is known by various other names  Kalyan Koduri, Kalyana Ramana, Kalyani Koduri, Kalyani, Koduri Kalyan.

Career 
Malik started off as a chorus singer with his brother M. M. Keeravani's compositions. Later, it was with the song "Sannajaji Poova" from Yuvaratna, composed by his brother, that he was noticed as a full fledged singer. After singing quite good number of songs for his brother, he started assisting his brother and learned the nuances of music composing. After gaining experience, his journey as a solo music director started with jingles, TV serials and finally the entry to the silver screen happened with Aithe, which instantly got him into the limelight. This was follow by hit albums such as Ashta Chemma, Ala Modalaindi, Golconda High School and Oohalu Gusagusalade.

Discography

Awards and nominations 
Mirchi Music Awards South
2014 – Best Playback singer Male  – Oohalu Gusagusalade for "Em Sandeham Ledu" – won
2014 – Music Composer of The Year  –  Oohalu Gusagusalade  – won

Filmfare Awards South
 2012 – Best Music Director – Telugu  –  Ala Modalaindi –  nominated
 2014 –  Best Music Director – Telugu  –  Oohalu Gusagusalade  – nominated

South Indian International Movie Awards
 2015 – Best Music Director (Telugu) – Jyo Achyutananda – nominated

References

External links 

Living people
Telugu people
Tamil film score composers
Telugu film score composers
1972 births
Musicians from Andhra Pradesh
People from Andhra Pradesh